Namma Ooru Nalla Ooru is a 1986 Indian Tamil-language film, directed by V. Azhagappan. The film stars Ramarajan, Rekha, Rajeev and Sulakshana. It was released on 28 November 1986, and Ramarajan won the Cinema Express Award for Best New Face Actor.

Plot

Cast 

Ramarajan as Ramu
Rekha as Sita
Rajeev
Sulakshana
S. S. Chandran
Senthil
Vinu Chakravarthy
K. K. Soundar
Rajavelu as Judge
Pasi Narayanan
'Director' Dasarathan
S. Ramasamy
Manohan
Kovai Balu
Karunakaran
Balraj
Vasanthi
Kaarai K. Balan
Baby Saarah
Shankar–Ganesh in a friendly appearance

Soundtrack 
Soundtrack was composed by Gangai Amaran.

Reception 
N. Krishnaswamy of The Indian Express criticised the film and called the screenplay "simply atrocious". Ramarajan won the Cinema Express Award for Best New Face Actor.

References

External links 
 

1980s Tamil-language films
1986 films
Films scored by Gangai Amaran